Edward Joseph "Eddie" Malone, (born 6 April 1985) is a Scottish association football player, who plays for East Stirlingshire.

Malone has also been on the books of many other Scottish clubs, as well as playing trial league matches with Greenock Morton and Berwick Rangers. Malone was born in Edinburgh and started his senior career with St Johnstone. He then played for Clyde and became the vice-captain of the team. He signed a contract with SPL club St Mirren on 30 January 2007 and then moved to Dundee for a month-long loan in November of that year. This turned into a permanent position in January 2008. He was released by the club on 4 May 2010 with eight other players. Malone played for Raith Rovers for the 2012–13 seasons and for Stenhousemuir for the 2013–14 season.

Career
Malone, who was born in Edinburgh, played alongside current Scotland internationalist Scott Brown and against Republic of Ireland internationalist Aiden McGeady during his youth career. He began his senior career with St Johnstone where he made a dozen or so appearances and scored once against Queen of the South.

Malone left St Johnstone and headed to Clyde in a swap deal for Kevin Fotheringham. Malone made his Clyde debut in a goalless draw against St Mirren in the Scottish Football League First Division in September 2004. Malone went on to become an integral part of the team, fulfilling a variety of positions, including central defence, central midfield, and his favored left wing back position. Malone was only one of four players that survived the clear-out of summer 2005. In 2005–06, under new manager Graham Roberts, Malone hit the peak of his form. Malone scored the winning goal in Clyde's remarkable Scottish Cup victory over giants Celtic.

Malone signed a contract with Scottish Premier League club St Mirren on 30 January 2007. In November 2007, he joined Dundee in a month-long loan. Malone signed for Dundee permanently in January 2008 on a two and a half year contract., but was released by the club on 4 May 2010 along with 8 other players.

He appeared as a trialist in league games for Greenock Morton and Berwick Rangers. On 18 September 2010, Malone was listed as a trialist for Second Division club Ayr United in their 3–2 away victory over East Fife, completing the whole game. He then signed a contract at Somerset Park scoring his first goal for Ayr against Livingston.

On 16 May 2012, Malone signed a pre contract agreement with Raith Rovers after impressing then manager John McGlynn. Despite McGlynn leaving to manage Hearts, Malone joined Raith for the 2012–13 season. In May 2013, he was freed by Raith Rovers. For the 2013–14 season, Malone signed up with Stenhousemuir.

In January 2015, Malone signed for Lowland Football League side Spartans. He moved to Forfar Athletic for a "modest fee" in January 2017.

Malone returned to play in the Lowland league in 2019 with East Stirlingshire F.C.
Malone started regularly at centre-back for most of the 2019–20 season, and was appointed vice-captain to Nicky Low for the 2020–21 season.

Honours
Clyde
Scottish Challenge Cup
Runner-up: 2006–07

Dundee
Scottish First Division
Runner-up: 2009–10
Scottish Challenge Cup
Winner: 2009–10

Ayr United
Scottish Second Division
Runner-up: 2010–11

See also

2004–05 Clyde F.C. season | 2005–06 | 2006–07
2010–11 Greenock Morton F.C. season

References

External links

1985 births
Footballers from Edinburgh
Living people
Association football fullbacks
Scottish footballers
St Johnstone F.C. players
Clyde F.C. players
St Mirren F.C. players
Dundee F.C. players
Scottish Football League players
Scottish Premier League players
Greenock Morton F.C. players
Stenhousemuir F.C. players
Berwick Rangers F.C. players
Spartans F.C. players
Ayr United F.C. players
Raith Rovers F.C. players
Forfar Athletic F.C. players
Scottish Professional Football League players
Lowland Football League players
East Stirlingshire F.C. players